The 2017 French motorcycle Grand Prix was the fifth round of the 2017 MotoGP season. It was held at the Bugatti Circuit in Le Mans on May 21, 2017.

MotoGP race report
Yamaha riders clean swept the front row of the grid for the first time since the 2008 Qatar Grand Prix. Teammates Maverick Viñales and Valentino Rossi fought for the victory throughout, with the Italian crashing out for the final lap, and Viñales taking his third win for Yamaha in five races. Johann Zarco scored his first podium finish and became the first French rider in the MotoGP class to stand on the podium since Randy de Puniet in the 2009 British Grand Prix.

Classification

MotoGP

Moto2

Moto3
The race, scheduled to be run for 24 laps, was red-flagged due to oil being spilled onto the track resulting to a multiple rider crash in turn 4. The race was later restarted over 16 laps.

Championship standings after the race

MotoGP
Below are the standings for the top five riders and constructors after round five has concluded.

Riders' Championship standings

Constructors' Championship standings

 Note: Only the top five positions are included for both sets of standings.

Moto2

Moto3

Notes

References

French
Motorcycle Grand Prix
French motorcycle Grand Prix
Motorcycle Grand Prix